Sancho Pardo Cárdenas y Figueroa (died January 1671) was a Roman Catholic prelate who served as Bishop of Panamá (1664–1671).

Biography
On 24 March 1664, Sancho Pardo Cárdenas y Figueroa was appointed by the King of Spain and confirmed by Pope Urban VIII, as Bishop of Panamá. On May 17, 1665, he was consecrated bishop by Pedro de Villagómez Vivanco, Archbishop of Lima. He served as Bishop of Panamá until his death in January 1671.

References

External links and additional sources
 (for Chronology of Bishops) 
 (for Chronology of Bishops) 

1671 deaths
Bishops appointed by Pope Urban VIII
17th-century Roman Catholic bishops in Panama
Roman Catholic bishops of Panamá